Her Better Self is a 1917 American silent drama film starring Pauline Frederick and Thomas Meighan and directed by Robert G. Vignola. It was produced by Famous Players Film Company and distributed by Paramount Pictures. It is now considered lost.

Cast
 Pauline Frederick - Vivian Tyler
 Thomas Meighan - Dr. Robert Keith
 Alice Hollister - Aggie May
 Maude Turner Gordon - Mrs.Tyler
 Charles Wellesley - Mr. Tyler
 Frank De Rheim - Count Belloto
 Armand Cortes - Dopey

Reception
Like many American films of the time, Her Better Self was subject to cuts by city and state film censorship boards. The Chicago Board of Censors required cuts of two scenes of a girl walking away with a man and the arrest of the girl, an intertitle stating "I left the town in disgrace," and the stabbing in the suicide scene and the vision of the same.

See also
List of lost films

References

External links

Her Better Self (1917) synopsis at tcm.com

1917 films
1917 drama films
Silent American drama films
American silent feature films
American black-and-white films
Films directed by Robert G. Vignola
Lost American films
Paramount Pictures films
1917 lost films
Lost drama films
1910s American films